The  Dubrovnik chess set is a style of chess pieces influenced by the Staunton chess set and used to play the game of chess. These chessmen are considered to have significant historical importance and are regarded as a timeless design classic. Over the decades the Dubrovnik chessmen were redesigned several times.

1950 Dubrovnik chess set

The 9th Chess Olympiad was organized by the FIDE and the government of Yugoslavia, supported by Josip Broz Tito. The Olympiad was held in Dubrovnik, SR Croatia, Yugoslavia (now in Croatia) between August 20 and September 11, 1950. Chess is a significant part of the culture in Dubrovnik being first documented in 1422.  The Olympiad had 84 chess players representing 16 nations who played a total of 480 games. The Yugoslav team won the gold medal, Argentina silver and West Germany bronze.

In 1949 the Olympiad management requisitioned a new style of chessmen. Painter and sculptor P. Poček was contracted to design the Olympiad chessmen. The pieces were made in Subozan in Subotica, Yugoslavia.

The 1950 Dubrovnik chess set was designed without religious symbols. The pieces were designed for play with wide bases requiring a minimum of  chessboard squares. They had green felted sliders and were not weighted. The chess box was felted with a metallic badge on the inside of the box with the inscription "IX. šah olimpijada Dubrovnik, Jugoslavija." The box was unusually large, featuring  squares. Approximately 50 chess sets were made with original sets being very rare if not impossible to locate or buy.

In a radio interview Bobby Fischer stated: "This [1950 Dubrovnik chess set] is the best set I have ever played on.  It is marvellous."  Fischer owned a 1950 Dubrovnik chess set that he kept in a safe, which was subsequently sold by a storage company to pay for an outstanding storage bill.  A chess collector provided a chess set after Fischer requested it for the 1992 Fischer–Spassky rematch held at Sveti Stefan.

Variants
The Dubrovnik design has influenced the creation of several chess set variants with a variety of names, including but not limited to, Zagreb and Yugoslavia. These variant chess sets often have opposite coloured finials on the kings and queens, while the original Dubrovnik had opposite coloured finials for the bishops. In addition, the chess sets use different specifications from the Dubrovnik.

In the 1960s a redesigned version by  Andrija Maurović, a famous Croat cartoonist, writer and chess player was created and produced in the workshop of master craftsman Jakopović in Zagreb. Bobby Fischer was often filmed and photographed with his own 1970 Dubrovnik chess set that was later stolen. The most obvious changes in design can be observed in the knights with simplified carving, and the queens had only five cuts in the crown as opposed to the original eleven.

Modern-day manufacturers
Due to the continuing popularity of the 1950 Dubrovnik chess sets, the replica plastic versions of the chess sets are the most popular in Eastern Europe, even though they are of low quality.  

Gregor Novak of Noj. Ltd makes by hand and offers for sale an exact replica from wood of both the 1950 Dubrovnik chess set and the 1970 Dubrovnik chess set.

Chess Bazaar of India also offers two different variants of 1970 Dubrovnik reproduction in a variety of woods.

Since 2014, the House of Staunton has offered a replica in wood of one of the 1970 Dubrovnik chess sets that were available at that time.

See also

Makonde chess set
Selenus chess set
Staunton chess set

Gallery

References

Chess sets
Dubrovnik
1950 in chess
Products introduced in 1950
1970 in chess
Products introduced in 1970